The Reverend Richard F. Bansemer (born May 26, 1940) is a Lutheran pastor who served as Bishop of the Virginia Synod from 1987-1999.  Richard F. Bansemer was born  to Reinhold Matthias and Oralee Ann Brierly Bansemer.

Bansemer was ordained in 1966, with a Bachelor of Divinity from Southern Seminary. He holds honorary Doctor of Divinity Degrees from Roanoke College in Salem, Virginia, and from Newberry College, Newberry, South Carolina.  He married Miss Mary Ann Troutman in 1971.  The Reverend Bansemer served University Lutheran in Gainesville Florida (1966-1968), and then St. John parish in Roanoke from 1968-1973, and was then called to serve as pastor and mission developer of Lord of the Mountains Lutheran in Dillon, Colorado.  From 1978-1987 he served Rural Retreat Parish (Grace and St. Paul) in Rural Retreat, Virginia, and then served as Bishop of the Virginia Synod from 1987 until his retirement in 1999.

References

20th-century Lutheran bishops
Evangelical Lutheran Church in America bishops
1940 births
Living people
People from Rural Retreat, Virginia